Mordechai is the third studio album by American musical trio Khruangbin. It was released June 26, 2020 under Dead Oceans and Night Time Stories.

Critical reception

Mordechai has a score of 79 out of 100 on Metacritic, indicating "generally favorable reviews", based on 16 reviews. Dylan Barnabe of Exclaim! reviewed Mordechai is an ode to all that Khruangbin have achieved and a look forward to everything that is to come. Sophia Ordaz of Slant Magazine said "While past Khruangbin albums risked coming off merely as studied tributes to the microcosms of Thai and Iranian rock, Mordechai finds Khruangbin coming into their own, thanks to the band’s lyrical development and the honing of their fusion of intercontinental influences."

Track listing

Charts

Weekly charts

Year-end charts

References

2020 albums
Khruangbin albums
Night Time Stories albums
Dead Oceans albums